Narayan Prasad is a member of the Bharatiya Janata Party from Bihar. He was tourism minister of Bihar. He has won the Bihar Legislative Assembly election in 2015 from Nautan.

References

Living people
People from West Champaran district
Bharatiya Janata Party politicians from Bihar
Bihar MLAs 2015–2020
Bahujan Samaj Party politicians from Bihar
Lok Janshakti Party politicians
Bihar MLAs 2020–2025
1958 births